, son of regent Teruyoshi, was a Japanese kugyō (court noble) of the Edo period (1603–1868). He held a regent position kampaku from 1814 to 1823. His wife was a daughter of Hosokawa Narishige, eighth head of Kumamoto Domain.

Family
 Father: Ichijo Teruyoshi
 Mother: Tokugawa Atsuko
 Wife: Hosokawa Tomiko
 Children:
 Ichijō Sanemichi (1788-1805) by Tomiko
 Hideko (1825-1850) married Tokugawa Iesada by Tomiko
 Ichijō Tadaka (1812-1863) by Tomiko
 Koga Takemichi (1815-1903) by Tomiko
 Tomoko married Ikeda Nariteru by Tomiko
 Michiko married Matsudaira Yorisato by Tomiko
 Takako married Takatsukasa Sukehiro by Tomiko

References
 

1774 births
1837 deaths
Fujiwara clan
Ichijō family